"Alfonsina y el mar" is a zamba composed by Argentine pianist Ariel Ramírez and written by Argentine writer Félix Luna. It was first released as part of Mercedes Sosa's 1969 album Mujeres argentinas. The song is a tribute to Argentine poet Alfonsina Storni, who committed suicide in 1938 by jumping into the sea from a jetty. The song is a classic and has been interpreted by many artists of different nationalities.

References

Further reading
 

1969 songs